"KLK" (abbreviation of "qué lo qué", a colloquial expression for "what's up?") is a song recorded by Venezuelan musician Arca featuring vocals by Spanish new flamenco singer Rosalía. Written by both of the performers in Barcelona, Spain, the track was released on 22 June 2020 through XL Recordings and Columbia Records as the fourth single off Arca's fourth studio album Kick I.

In December 2021, a remixed version featuring Ivy Queen and La Goony Chonga premiered exclusively on Motomami Los Santos, Arca and Rosalía's own Grand Theft Auto V radio station.

Background
Arca and Rosalía have been friends since 2018. Their friendship started when Arca discovered the Spanish singer through her hit single "Malamente" and saw her set at the Sónar music festival. In April 2019, during an Instagram livestream, Arca teased a song titled "KLK" and stated "I can't wait to put this record out". The couple of friends were seen in public again at Frank Ocean's PrEP+ Party in New York City, where the Venezuelan played a special DJ set. In November 2019, Rosalía sampled Arca's voice as an interlude to transition from "A Palé" to "Con altura" during her performance at the 20th Annual Latin Grammy Awards.

On 8 March 2020, Arca revealed to Garage Magazine that her new album would be released in 2020 and that would feature collaborations with Björk and Rosalía among others, confirming the participation of the Spanish new flamenco artist in her fourth studio album. On 21 June, Arca and Rosalía had a conversation on an Instagram livestream where they discussed the track and previewed it. Without any previous announcement, "KLK" was released on digital download and different streaming platforms the day after, along with its instrumental version.

Composition
The track was first recorded in Barcelona on 17 September 2018 and was lyric empty. Since Rosalía was promoting her second studio album El mal querer (2018) in Madrid and Miami, her vocals were sent to Arca through a WhatsApp voice note. Thus, the song has partly been recorded using an iPhone. "KLK" was also produced by Venezuelan musician and Arca's high school friend , who records under the stage name Cardopusher.

About "KLK", Arca explains that it is inspired by traditional Venezuelan music, specifically an instrument called furruco: "Venezuelan music has always been with me, and I am grateful that I have studied some of the typical styles of Venezuelan music. I always think of the furruco when I program a subbass. It is an indigenous instrument of Venezuela that is played with friction, you rub a stick hooked from the leather of a large drum and it has a super infra sub bass, it marks the pulse of the gaita, a style of music typical of Venezuela".

Credits and personnel
Credits adapted from Tidal.

 Alejandra Ghersi – producer, composer
 Rosalía – lyricist
  – producer, composer
 Alex Epton – mixer, studio personnel

Track listing
 Digital download – streaming
 "KLK"  – 3:47
 "KLK" (Instrumental) – 3:47

Release history

References

2020 singles
2020 songs
Rosalía songs
Songs written by Rosalía
Songs written by Arca (musician)